Foxhole is a 2021 American war drama film written and directed by Jack Fessenden and starring James LeGros and Andi Matichak.

Cast
Motell Gyn Foster as Jackson
Cody Kostro as Clark
Angus O'Brien as Conrad
Alex Hurt as Morton
Alex Breaux as the German
Asa Spurlock as Confederate Soldier
James LeGros as Wilson
Andi Matichak as Gale

Production
Principal photography lasted sixteen days.  Filming wrapped in New York in August 2019.

Release
In November 2021, it was announced that Samuel Goldwyn Films acquired North American distribution rights to the film, which premiered at the 2021 Oldenburg International Film Festival.

Reception
The film has a 67% rating on Rotten Tomatoes based on twelve reviews.

John DeFore of The Hollywood Reporter gave the film a positive review, calling it "a movie that almost entirely rises to the height of its ambitions."

Marya E. Gates of RogerEbert.com  awarded the film three stars.

References

External links
 
 
 

2020s English-language films